Begg Rock,  high, is  northwest of Vizcaino Point, the west point of San Nicolas Island, Ventura County, California, United States. It is about 11.5 by 6.7 meters in size, or 61 square meters in area. This rock may be found on NOAA chart 18755. This rock was given its name by the Coast Survey. It was named for the boat, John Begg, which struck a nearby rock in 1824.

Begg Rock is most famous to scuba divers as an extremely exotic, beautiful and challenging dive location that provides opportunity for excellent photography. It extends almost vertically down from above the surface to way too deep. It is actually a number of pinnacles, a couple of which are always above water and a couple that are only exposed at low tide. Being in the open current, it is covered with thick growths of filter feeders. There are not many fish, because the vertical walls have few holes and cracks for fish habitat. The upper part is covered with mussels, green anemones and pisaster starfish. While pretty, it is usually surgey enough to make for difficult diving. Below 40 feet are large areas of brilliantly colored Corynactus anemones (Strawberry anemones). Past about 70 feet are patches of delicate white Metridium anemones. The site used to be famous for large rock scallops. At this location they were attached so solidly to the rocks that they could not be broken off and had to be opened and the inside removed with the upper shell. They did get depleted by hunters, but now Begg Rock is in the no take zone. Diving past 120 feet shows a cold, dark, exotic world. It is so remote and exposed that even if a dive boat schedules to go there, it is only reachable and divable occasionally. This is an advanced dive site where a diver can accidentally get dangerously deep. Currents can be a hazard as well. There are other hazards, but it is a beautiful dive.

Footnotes

References

External links
NOAA Chart 18755 
 Diving the remote, beautiful, exotic and challenging Begg Rock

Islands of Ventura County, California
Islands of Southern California
Uninhabited islands of California
Islands of California
Pacific islands of California